State House, formerly called Government House, is a former Government House in Bulawayo, Zimbabwe. It was used by the British South Africa Company during their rule in Rhodesia. It was built by Cecil Rhodes in 1897 as his personal residence. It is now used as the official Bulawayo residence for the President of Zimbabwe.

History 
The ground which Government House was built on was formerly the site of a kraal where Lobengula, King of the Northern Ndebele people won a battle. When it was built by Cecil Rhodes, it was one of the first permanent British buildings constructed in Rhodesia. The garden contained a large tree under which Rhodes and Lobengula negotiated treaties. It was intended to be Rhodes' personal residence and was designed based on Groote Schuur in Cape Town in the Cape Colony.

Following Southern Rhodesia gaining responsible government, it became a British government property. In 1964, the British Prime Minister Harold Wilson met Joshua Nkomo of the then banned Zimbabwe African People's Union there to discuss Southern Rhodesian independence under black rule against the wishes of the Prime Minister of Southern Rhodesia Ian Smith. When Smith declared Rhodesia an independent country unilaterally under minority rule, it became an official residence of the Prime Minister of Rhodesia and was the location of Smith's last official public engagement as Prime Minister before the establishment of Zimbabwe Rhodesia. 

Following the establishment of Zimbabwe in 1980, the Prime Minister Robert Mugabe demanded it be renamed State House alongside Government House in Salisbury. It was left in a state of disrepair by 2011 due to Mugabe rarely using it when in Bulawayo. Reportedly it was so bad, even the toilets were broken. Despite this, it has still been used to host state events. In 2018, the new President Emmerson Mnangagwa announced he would be renovating the State House to restore it after the neglect under Mugabe.

References 

Government Houses of the British Empire and Commonwealth
Government buildings in Zimbabwe
Government buildings completed in 1897
Rhodesia
Southern Rhodesia
British South Africa Company
Cecil Rhodes
1897 establishments in Africa
Buildings and structures in Bulawayo
Prime ministerial residences